Tema (Bulgarian: Theme) was a weekly social and political magazine based in Bulgaria. It was one of the influential magazines in the country and was in circulation from 2001 to 2015.

History and profile
Tema was first published in September 2001. Modeled on Time and Newsweek the magazine covered news, current affairs and investigative journalism work. The publisher was United Free Media. Its sister publication was the daily paper Преса (Bulgarian: Presa). In 2011 the Bulgarian Ministry of Transport, Information Technology and Communications issued a stamp for Tema'''s tenth anniversary.Tema'' was closed down on 31 July 2015 due to financial problems.

References

External links
 

2001 establishments in Bulgaria
2015 disestablishments in Bulgaria
Bulgarian-language magazines
Defunct magazines published in Bulgaria
Defunct political magazines
Magazines established in 1998
Magazines disestablished in 2015
Magazines published in Bulgaria
Weekly magazines